José-Antonio Campos-Ortega (1940–2004) was a German neurobiologist born in Valencia Spain. He was known as a pioneer of developmental-genetic studies of early neurogenesis.

References

 
 
 

20th-century German biologists
German neuroscientists
1940 births
2004 deaths
Spanish emigrants to Germany